Phone charms (also phone danglers, phone lanyards, phone chains and phone straps) are charms that are connected to a mobile device either via a phone connector or silicone plug that fits into the jack port sometimes provided with circle cotters and a lobster clasp, or a small strap knotted with a cow hitch knot, or a lanyard. Some phones may have a loop hole through which a strap can be attached or a phone case may be needed for the strap in phones that lack a loop hole. Phone straps have now become a cultural phenomenon beyond their basic utilities, and they may be themed with famous characters such as Hello Kitty. Phone straps may also serve additional functions, such as screen cleaning.

History
Phone charms first originated in Japan and later in the United States. They are gradually becoming popular in the United Kingdom and Ireland. In recent years, it has been popular to accessorize a phone this way, and Maki-e stickers are also becoming more common, especially in Japan, and to a lesser extent, Asia.

Types of charms

There are a variety of charms available, such as little figurine characters, rhinestone crystal charms, and small teddy bears. Some charms flash or light up when the phone rings. Many charms also have a small bell attached and there are charms available in Gashapon machines, many of which are based on characters from various popular franchises, such as video games. There are also some charms in which one may put on the finger to clean the device's display.

See also
 Charm bracelet
 Key chain

Mobile phones
Fashion accessories